Sylvie Garneau-Tsodikova is a French Canadian chemist who is a Professor and Associate Dean at the University of Kentucky. Her research considers the development of new molecules that can combat bacterial resistance.

Early life and education 
Garneau-Tsodikova was born in Quebec City, Canada. She attended the Université Laval for her undergraduate studies in chemistry, where she graduated top of the class. As a student, she was honoured with several awards, including distinguishments from the Chemical Institute of Canada and Natural Sciences and Engineering Research Council. She completed a Master's thesis on the synthesis of glutamyl transfer RNA synthetase inhibitors. She moved to the University of Alberta for graduate studies, where she worked on the impact of antimicrobial agents of bacterial cell walls. During her doctoral studies she became interested in infectious diseases and the development of antibacterial agents.

Research and career 
Garneau-Tsodikova moved to the Harvard Medical School for her postdoctoral training where she worked with Christopher T. Walsh on the formation and modification of dipyrroles. At Harvard she was trained in both enzymology and biochemistry. In 2006, Garneau-Tsodikova moved to the University of Michigan, where she was made Assistant Professor in the College of Pharmacy. She spent seven years at Michigan, until she moved to the University of Kentucky. She was promoted to Professor and Assistant Dean in 2018.

Garneau-Tsodikova's research focuses on the development of antifungal and antibacterial agents. In particular, Garneau-Tsodikova studied tuberculosis and Candida auris resistant pathogens. She was involved with the development of multifunctional enzymes with tuneable biological properties. She is an Associate Editor of the Royal Society of Chemistry journal Medicinal Chemistry.

Selected publications

References 

Living people
Year of birth missing (living people)
Université Laval alumni
University of Alberta alumni
University of Kentucky faculty
Canadian women chemists
21st-century Canadian chemists
21st-century Canadian women scientists